Nathan Tutt (born 23 January 1980) is a former professional rugby league footballer who played for the Sydney Roosters, St. George Illawarra Dragons and Manly Warringah Sea Eagles.

Playing career
Tutt made his first grade debut for Sydney Roosters in Round 18 2001 against the Northern Eagles.  

In 2002, Tutt moved to St George and in his first season played in both finals games for the club.  

In 2004, Tutt joined Manly-Warringah and played 3 seasons for the club before retiring.

References

1980 births
Australian rugby league players
Sydney Roosters players
St. George Illawarra Dragons players
Manly Warringah Sea Eagles players
Redcliffe Dolphins players
Rugby league second-rows
Rugby league locks
Living people
Rugby league players from Sydney